The 2018 Kohler Grand Prix was an IndyCar Series event held at Road America in Elkhart Lake, Wisconsin. The race served as the 10th round of the 2018 IndyCar Series season. Reigning champion Josef Newgarden qualified on pole position, and took victory in the 55 lap race.

Results

Qualifying

Race 

Notes:
 Points include 1 point for leading at least 1 lap during a race, an additional 2 points for leading the most race laps, and 1 point for Pole Position.

Championship standings after the race 

Drivers' Championship standings

Manufacturer standings

 Note: Only the top five positions are included.

References 

Kohler Grand Prix
Kohler Grand Prix
2018 Kohler Grand Prix
Kohler Grand Prix